Massacre Mafia Style (also known as The Executioner or Like Father, Like Son) is a 1974 independent film written, directed, produced by, and starring Italian-American crooner-actor Duke Mitchell. The tagline for the film was "You’re IN, or you’re IN THE WAY."

Massacre Mafia Style was written, produced, self-financed and directed by Duke Mitchell, and was accumulated from all of his real-life run-ins with similar characters and mob stories. Duke Mitchell was an actor and singer (providing the singing voice of Fred Flintstone in The Flintstones cartoons) and was once part of a comedy duo with partner Sammy Petrillo who together starred in the 1952 cult film Bela Lugosi Meets a Brooklyn Gorilla with Bela Lugosi of Dracula fame. The pair whose act, Mitchell & Petrillo, was imitative of Martin & Lewis (Dean Martin and Jerry Lewis),  was sued by Lewis after the Lugosi film was released. Mitchell went on to become a well-known crooner and nightclub act in Los Angeles, Las Vegas and as such, was known as the “King” of Palm Springs and ran in some of the same circles as pal Frank Sinatra. His nightclub act revolved around his Sinatra-like crooning and rockabilly Italian-American songs. With such behind-the-scenes access, Mitchell often used several of the nightclubs that he sang in as locations for his films; such places as The Buggy Whip in Los Angeles.
 
Mitchell would use the money he made singing to fund his independent films. Several of Mitchell's projects never saw the light of day, including his next film Gone with the Pope which only existed as a work print when it was found in a garage by Grindhouse Releasing’s Bob Murawski and Sage Stallone. It was carefully restored and released theatrically in 2011 by Grindhouse Releasing, which has also restored and released Mitchell's Massacre Mafia Style on Blu-ray in 2015.

While not prosecuted for obscenity, the film was seized and confiscated in the UK under Section 3 of the Obscene Publications Act 1959 during the video nasty panic.

Plot
The film opens with an over-the-top violent sequence depicting the massacre of an entire office building's worth of inhabitants to the tune of one of Duke Mitchell's upbeat Italian-American songs, executed so merrily, that it was used as the film's theatrical trailer. Duke Mitchell plays Mimi Miceli, the son of a high-powered mafia don Mimi, a first generation Italian-American who has been exiled back to Sicily for his crimes in America. The don's son Mimi Jr. wants to get back into the family business and transplant it from New York to the streets of Hollywood, the place of his childhood dreams. Mimi heads to Hollywood where he looks up his old Mafioso buddy, Jolly (Vic Caesar) who he finds tending bar. Jolly doesn't need much convincing to join Mimi back in a life of crime. Mimi tells Jolly his plan to kidnap one of the West Coast Mafia bosses, Chucky Tripoli (Louis Zito) and hold him for ransom, much-needed cash flow to start Mimi's takeover. Tripoli is kidnapped and Mimi sends proof (Tripoli's finger in a jewelry box) to Tripoli's son and wife (played by Duke Mitchell's real-life wife, Jo Mitchell). Mimi is back in the life and makes a visit to Tripoli's daughter's wedding, giving a toast in the name of Sicily and on behalf of his mafia family. It seems that Mimi's plan is working as he is tolerated within the West Coast clan, even when he hits on their dates. Mimi goes home with one of the women at the wedding (Cara Salerno) who goes along for the ride. With the blessing of the clan, Mimi attempts to takedown a big time West Coast pimp by the name of Superspook (Jimmy Williams) who runs a hustle with “40 women” in the prime real estate between Hollywood and Beverly Hills. Superspook turns out to not be so easy to take down, as the old ways of Mimi don't have the same effect on the new hippie generation.

Production
Massacre Mafia Style was filmed on location in Los Angeles.  It was edited by Tony Mora and by Emmy-nominated editor Robert Florio (who would also go on to edit on Mitchell's next film Gone with the Pope). Mitchell was said to have been inspired by 1972's The Godfather directed by Francis Ford Coppola and makes a reference to the famous movie in his dialogue, without naming it specifically.
During the 1970s, the poliziotteschi (crime-action) genre in Italy was exploding. However, there were very few American-made mafia films catching fire besides the namesake Godfather film. Mitchell was clearly influenced by Coppola's work (as well as Scorsese’s) and was moved to tell his version of what it’s like to be an Italian-American, using his own nightclub points-of-reference and his bird's-eye-view of those Italian-American businessmen and their “spaghetti” traditions.

Mitchell's next film, Gone with the Pope was originally shot the next year but was not originally completed when Mitchell died from lung cancer, and remained unfinished until 2009. The film negative and unfinished cut work print were discovered in Mitchell's parking garage several years after his death. It has been edited and restored by cult film distributor Grindhouse Releasing which has also re-released Massacre Mafia Style on Blu-ray and DVD.

Release
The movie was released theatrically in 1978 by Moonstone Entertainment, but didn't begin quietly building a cult audience until released on VHS by Video Gems in the 1980s. It has since been rediscovered, restored and re-released by Grindhouse Releasing and with it, a cult status growing ever stronger. In 2015, Grindhouse Releasing released a digitally restored version of the film on Blu-ray for the first time. Nathanial Thompson of TCM (Turner Classic Movies) Underground called the film “mind-bending” adding that “with Duke Mitchell's cult following steadily building on what seems to be a daily basis, one can only wonder how far and wide the legacy of this entertainment jack of all trades will go.” Josh Hurtado of Twitchfilm commented that it's “the rare film that is BETTER than its trailer... a great forgotten gem.”  The reviewers at the Las Vegas Sun noted that Massacre Mafia Style is “a virtual torrent of bloodshed” and that it “makes the GODFATHER movies look like Sunday school picnic outings!”

See also
 List of American films of 1974

References

External links
 

1974 films
1970s crime comedy-drama films
American crime comedy-drama films
American exploitation films
American black comedy films
Films about immigration
Mafia films
Films set in California
Films shot in California
Films set in Los Angeles
Films shot in Los Angeles
1974 drama films
1970s exploitation films
1970s English-language films
1970s American films